Real estate is land property, especially in the context of buying, selling and renting

Real Estate may also refer to:

Music
 Real Estate (band), an American indie rock band
 Real Estate (album), the group's 2009 debut album
 Real Estate, a 2001 album by English rock band Dodgy

Film and television
 Real Estate TV, a 2004-2009 UK TV channel
 "Real Estate", a 2012 episode in season 3 of the American TV series Haven
 The Real Estate, a 2018 Swedish drama film

Other
 Real property, the legal concept of real estate in English common law
 Real Estate Building, a building in Bangor, Pennsylvania